Vandkunsten may refer to:

 Vandkunsten, a square in Copenhagen, Denmark
 Tegnestuen Vandkunsten, an architectural firm named after it
 Forlaget Vandkunsten, a publishing house also named after it